The Apostolic Vicariate (or Vicariate Apostolic) of Caroní is a Latin Church missionary jurisdiction or apostolic vicariate of the Catholic Church in Venezuela.
 
It is immediately exempt to the Holy See and not part of any ecclesiastical province. Its cathedral, Catedral de Santa Elena, is located in the episcopal see of Santa Elena de Uairén in Venezuela's landlocked Bolívar state.

History 
On 4 March 1922 Pope Pius XI established the Apostolic Vicariate of Caroní. 
 
It lost territory in 1954 when the Apostolic Vicariate of Tucupita was established.

Incumbent Ordinaries 
So far, all apostolic vicars were Capucins (O.F.M. Cap.)
Benvenuto Diego Alonso y Nistal, O.F.M. Cap. † (23 Dec. 1923 – 24 March 1938)
Constantino Gómez Villa, O.F.M. Cap. † (14 July 1938 – 11 Oct. 1967)
Mariano Gutiérrez Salazar, O.F.M. Cap. † (11 March 1968 – 23 Oct. 1995)
Santiago Pérez Sánchez, O.F.M. Cap. † (28 May 1993 – 2 July 1994)
Jesús Alfonso Guerrero Contreras, O.F.M. Cap. (6 Dec. 1995 – 9 April 2011: Appointed Bishop of Machiques)
Felipe González González, O.F.M. Cap. (26 May 2014 – 27 April 2021)
Gonzalo Alfredo Ontiveros Vivas (27 April 2021 – present)

See also 
 Roman Catholicism in Venezuela
 List of Catholic dioceses (structured view)

References

External links 
 GigaCatholic, with incumbent biographies

Apostolic vicariates
Caroni
Christian organizations established in 1922
1922 establishments in Venezuela
Santa Elena de Uairén